Stuart Lester (born 8 February 1975) is a New Zealand former professional rugby league footballer who played professionally for Wigan.

His brother, Aaron, played professionally for the Auckland Warriors and Whitehaven.

Playing career
Lester made the Junior Kiwis in 1994 and was part of the side that defeated the Australian Schoolboys side for the first time.

In 1995 Lester was signed by the new Auckland Warriors franchise and played for the Warriors Colts in the Lion Red Cup. He was part of the side that lost the Grand Final that year. He remained with the Warriors in 1996, however he was limited to reserve grade appearances.

In August 1996 he was signed by the Wigan Warriors on a three-year contract, however due to a delay in a work permit he was not allowed to join the club until January 1997. Lester played eight games for the club during 1997's Super League II.

References

1975 births
Living people
Auckland rugby league team players
Counties Manukau rugby league team players
Ellerslie Eagles players
Junior Kiwis players
New Zealand rugby league players
Rugby league second-rows
Wigan Warriors players